Ladbroke is a surname, and may refer to:

 Felix Ladbroke (1771–1840), English banker and cricketer
 James Weller Ladbroke (died 1847), English property developer
 James Ladbroke (1772–1847), originally James Weller, cricketer, nephew of James Weller Ladbroke
 Robert Ladbroke (1713–1773), English politician, Lord Mayor of London in 1747